Flower preservation has existed since early history, although deliberate flower preservation is a more recent phenomenon. In the Middle East, the bones of pre-historic man were discovered with delicate wild flowers probably as a tribute to a passing loved one.  Evidence of deliberate use of specific flowers is indicated by the pollen grains that were present. Brightly colored and vivid flowers were also found in Egyptian tombs.  These flowers were approximated to be 4,000 years old.  In the sixteenth century medicinal nosegays began to give way to ornamental ones. Flowers essentially started to be used for decorative purposes such as jewels, fans and gloves. During the Elizabethan Age the once familiar ruff was replaced by soft lacy collars, and bosom flowers also became popular.

Out of the Victorian era grew the fascination of communicating with flowers carried in the nosegays. The idea of the language of flowers developed, when it was decided that giving and receiving a bouquet of flowers, when the flowers themselves carry a meaning, gives much greater pleasure.

Drying
One of the earliest methods of preserving flowers is by drying. Many plants retain their shape and color when air-dried naturally.

Use of glycerine, making the preserved plant supple and long-lasting. To use this method, the plant material needs to be gathered in a fully hydrated state. Water and glycerine are then mixed. The ratio of water to glycerine should be 2:1.  The water should be lukewarm for better mixing and faster absorption.  If the autumn colors are showing, it may be too late to preserve them in glycerine.

Pressing is a very easy way to preserve flowers although the relief is lost and the flowers are flat. Unglazed paper, such as newsprint or an old telephone book, is best for pressing. Flowers are spread so they do not overlap between several thicknesses of newspaper. Additional layers of paper and flowers can be built up and then covered with a board or piece of cardboard before pressing down with a heavy object. The time required for drying, depending on the flower size or tissue content, can be anywhere from two to four weeks.

Modern preservation methods

Hanging flowers in ventilated area
 There are several air-drying methods used for different kinds of flowers. The easiest and most effective way to dry most flowers is to tie them in small bundles with twine, raffia or ribbons, and hang them upside down, out of direct sunlight in a warm, well-ventilated place. Bunches should contain one type of flower. Large flowers are dried individually. The leaves stripped as soon as possible after picking. They retain moisture and slow down the drying process. Wall hooks, poles or wires are placed at least  from the ceiling. Heads should be staggered to allow plenty of air to circulate. This prevents mildew and rot. It may be necessary to re-tie bunches or individual flowers half way through the drying process, because the stems tend to shrink as they dry.
 The drying period can range from one week to several weeks depending on the type of material, when and where it was harvested and the humidity of the place where it is drying. The stems of hung flowers tend to dry unnaturally straight and the flowers become very brittle.
 Suggested flowers to air dry include: strawflowers, goldenrod, Hydrangeas, Celosia (crested and plumed types), globe amaranth, Salvia, Xeranthemum and many of the "everlastings."

Hot air drying in drying chamber
 Compact flowers like marigolds, chrysanthemums, cornflowers and zinnias dry well in a fan-assisted, convection chamber. Non-ventilated chambers are not appropriate, because they generate too much moisture. The material must be dried at a low temperature (30-35˚Celsius), over many hours. The flowers are slotted through holes in a wire mesh rack leaving room for the stems to dangle below. The time required depends upon the density of the flowers.

Silica gel drying
 Another trend is silica gel. Its initial cost is greater than that of borax-sand or borax-cornmeal combinations, but silica gel can be used over and over for many years. Silica gel dries flowers quickly, so it can be used to dry more flowers during a single season than the same quantity of a borax mixture. Silica gel is available under a number of trade names. It is white, but some types contain blue crystals that act as an indicator of the amount of moisture that has been absorbed. When these crystals are clear blue, the material is dry. As moisture is absorbed from the flowers, the crystals gradually turn pink. At that point, it is time to re-dry the crystals before using them again.
Materials to be preserved are then baked in an oven at 250˚Celsius for about an hour, or until the moisture-indicating crystals, if present, are blue again. Material is then stirred several times while drying.
 Flowers dried in silica gel must be placed in airtight containers. If a container is not sealed tightly, the silica gel absorbs moisture from the air, and flowers dry too slowly or not at all. A candy tin, plastic container, coffee can, large-mouth jar or any other container with a tight-fitting lid may be used. If no containers with tight lids are available, loose tops should be sealed with tape. Silica gel is especially useful for drying fragile plants and flowers with delicate colors. Flowers that dry best in silica gel are allium, anemone, cornflower, roses, tulip and zinnia.

Molecular sieve
 Molecular sieve is a material containing tiny pores of a precise and uniform size that is used as an absorbent for gases and liquids. They are metal alumino silicates which have a crystalline structure consisting of an assembly of tetrahedral.  The tetrahedral are made up of 4 oxygen atoms which occupy the summits surrounding either 1 silicon atom or an aluminium atom placed in the center.  Compensating cations (sodium, potassium) make the hole electrically neutral.  The hole forms an assembly of small cells (or pores) of uniform and known size, in which a molecule of smaller size can be trapped by the phenomenon known as absorption.
 To ensure the dehydration of the fresh natural flowers the mixture of organic solvents is poured onto the hole until the level exceeds the level of the flowers by about 2 cm.  The water molecules are progressively absorbed into the small cells or pores of the molecular sieve.
 The receptacle is closed hermetically for a few days.
 Once dried, the flower reabsorbs a little moisture of atmospheric origin, and this increases its suppleness and its plasticity.
 As molecular sieve relates to the long-term preservation and treatment of cut flowers for long duration, (i.e. continually maintaining their decorative properties ), Vermont Flowers has been using this method of preserving flowers instead of the traditional silica gel more than 20 years ago.  The advantage was a much more professional regeneration of the molecular sieves. Flowers which are particularly suitable for such a treatment are roses, peonies, camellias, marigolds, globe flowers, orchids, dahlias, carnations, phloxes, summer chrysanthemums, hollyhocks, and the like, and other species with many petals or a fairly rigid structure.

Freeze drying
 Originally introduced in 1813 by William Hyde Wollaston to the Royal Society in London, it was not until the late 80's the freeze-drying industry discovered the allurement and longevity of freeze-dried flowers.
 Freeze dried flowers are fresh flowers that have been specially dried to preserve their natural shape and color. Freeze drying is accomplished by a process called sublimation. It requires a special freeze-drying machine.
 It involves first freezing the flowers at 100K for at least 12 hours. A vacuum pump slowly pulls the moisture out of the flowers as a vapor in one chamber, and then the vapor condenses as ice in another chamber. Because of this process, the shape and natural color of the flower is maintained. It has been found that certain flowers retain their color well despite the fact they have been freeze-dried. Apparently, such flowers retain their color due to the tissue composition of the petals, leaves, and the like. Carnations, African violets, roses, asparagus and other ferns, and baby's breath exhibit good color retention notwithstanding the dehydration during the freeze-drying process. Those floral pieces which either dull or fade from dehydration may be given color by utilization of a florist's spray tint. This spray coloring restores the lost color which, in the sealed environment of the glass container of the final product, retains its given color along with the natural color of the other pieces.

Pressed
 This floral preservation has its roots in Victorian times, but has also been brought into the current list of Floral Preservation because of new techniques of pressing, vacuum sealing and color enhancing.  Pressed Floral Preservation involves pressing the flowers, using many different types of presses, depending on the flower type.  The art is then framed in a flat frame, to hang on the wall.  Vacuum sealing the art is recommended and the use of Museum Quality glass with a UV Factor of 97% to ensure the colors last.

Preservation in a resin pour 
A resin pour preservation allows for flowers like roses to be preserved in a clear transparent mould, making this method a great choice for ornamental preservation of flowers. Two separate resin elements are mixed in equal proportions and poured into a silicone mould, often in an ice cube shape, with the flower inserted. With each pour, a heat gun is used to remove air bubbles that form at the surface of the pour. Those attempting a resin pour preservation are recommended to wear a respirator and gloves as a resin pour can give off fumes and also a considerable amount of heat.

References

Further reading
Patricia Thorpe, Everlastings, the Complete Book of Dried Flowers, Houghton Mifflin Company, Quarto Marketing Ltd, 15 West 26th Street, New York, NY 10010, 1985.
Winifrede Morrison, Drying & Preserving Flowers, Dryad Press, 4 Fitzhardinge Street, London, Great Britain W1H0AH, 1985.

External links
 — What are preserved flowers? Everything you want to know about preserved flowers by Floralonly, Albert, published 28, May, 2020
Style your home with Dried & Preserved Flowers  - A perfect combination of thrift, sustainability, convenience, longevity and beauty in a single package

Floristry